Lohja sub-region  was a subdivision of Uusimaa and one of the Sub-regions of Finland. The sub-region was abolished in 2009 and merged into the Greater Helsinki.

Municipalities 
  Karjalohja
  Karkkila
  Lohja
  Nummi-Pusula
  Sammatti
  Vihti

History 
 January 1, 1997 the city of Lohja and the Lohja municipality were merged.
 January 1, 2009 Sammatti is merged into Lohja.

After the abolition 
 January 1, 2013 Nummi-Pusula and Karjalohja were merged into Lohja.

References 

Former sub-regions of Finland